Landesman is a surname. Notable people with the surname include:

 Cosmo Landesman (born 1954), American journalist, son of Fran and Jay Landesman
 Fran Landesman (1927–2011) née Frances Deitsch, American lyricist and poet
 Jay Landesman (1919–2011), American publisher and bon viveur
 Rocco Landesman (born 1947), American theatre producer

See also 
 Heinrich Landesmann (1821–1902), Czech-Austrian poet
 Landman (disambiguation)
 Landmann
 Lanzmann